Leonard Russell was an English journalist and satirist, known for editing Press Gang! Crazy World Chronicle (London 1937), a collection of satirical articles, supposedly real articles from British newspapers.  Contributors included Russell, Cyril Connolly, Hilaire Belloc, Ronald Knox and A. G. Macdonnell.

The most memorable article is by Cyril Connolly entitled 'Where Engels Fears to Tread', a mock book review which paints a brilliantly comic portrait of Brian Howard.

He married film critic Dilys Powell in 1943 and died aged 68 in 1974.

References

External Links
Leonard Russell Letters at the Harry Ransom Center

Year of birth missing
1974 deaths
English male journalists
English satirists